Paopi 6 - Coptic Calendar - Paopi 8

The seventh day of the Coptic month of Paopi, the second month of the Coptic year. On a common year, this day corresponds to October 4, of the Julian Calendar, and October 17, of the Gregorian Calendar.  This day falls in the Coptic season of Akhet, the season of inundation.

Commemorations 

 The departure of Saint Paul of Tammouh

References 

Days of the Coptic calendar